Elaiomycin is an antimicrobial chemical compound, classified as an azoxyalkene, which was first isolated from Streptomyces in 1954.  A laboratory synthesis of elaiomycin was reported in 1977.

A variety related compounds, collectively called elaiomycins, have also been reported.

References

Antimicrobials